Atlantik-Brücke (Atlantic Bridge) is a leading private non-profit association to promote German-American understanding and Atlanticism. Founded in Hamburg in 1952, it was located in Bonn between 1983 and 1999 and is now located in Berlin.

The association organizes invitation-only conferences, seminars and colloquia. Through various programs for "Young Leaders", military officers, journalists, and students, Atlantik-Brücke fosters social networks among current and future leaders in business and world affairs. Atlantik-Brücke also awards prizes in honor of Vernon A. Walters and Eric M. Warburg. Atlantik-Brücke annually presents the George H.W. Bush award, an award given to those who have improved German and U.S. relations. It was first given in August 2015 to its namesake, U.S. statesman Pres. George H.W. Bush at his residence Walker's Point Estate, Maine.

In 2014, the German political cabaret show Die Anstalt named the Atlantik-Brücke as one of several "NATO-friendly elite networks" that "are little more than transatlantic swinger-clubs". After exposing that several high-ranking German journalists and media moguls are members of the Atlantik-Brücke (among other American lobbying organisations), the broadcast criticised multiple widely circulated German newspapers as "being akin to local editions of the NATO press office". Following the broadcast, several journalists whose connections to the Atlantik-Brücke were exposed attempted to sue the ZDF for broadcasting the show. The lawsuit was struck down by the Federal Court of Justice in 2017, which ruled that no personal rights were violated and that the characterisations made by Die Anstalt were "quite accurate".

Young Leaders
The two Atlantik-Brücke Young Leaders conferences receive more than 500 applications per year, from which 120 Young Leaders are chosen with the help of a steering committee of political, business and academic leaders. Sixty young leaders are chosen for the German-American Conference (30 Americans and 30 Germans) and sixty are chosen for the European Conference. As of 2011, the German-American Young Leaders Conference has been running for 33 years.

Prominent Young Leaders alumni

Christian Wulff, Former Federal President of Germany 
Thomas de Maizière, Former Federal Minister of Interior
Karl-Theodor zu Guttenberg, Former Federal Minister of Defense 
Michael Otto, chairman of the supervisory board of Otto Group 
Jürgen Großmann, Chairman of the Managing Board of RWE
Thomas Enders, President and CEO of Airbus Industries 
Paul-Bernhard Kallen, chairman of the Board of Hubert Burda Media Holding 
Hans-Gert Pöttering, Former President of the European Parliament 
Charles Schumer, Senior U.S. Senator from New York 
Cem Özdemir, Chairman of Alliance 90/The Greens
 Edelgard Bulmahn Member of Parliament; Former Federal Minister of Education and Research 
 Michael Vassiliadis, chairman of the Board of IG BCE – Mining, Chemical and Energy Industrial Union 
 Wolfgang Ischinger, Former German Ambassador to the United States and Chair of the Munich Security Conference 
Richard Burt, Former United States Ambassador to Germany 
Craig Kennedy, President of the German Marshall Fund of the U.S.
Kai Diekmann, Editor-in-Chief of BILD Zeitung 
Katja Gloger, Editor-at-large, STERN Magazin 
Joshua Bolten, Former White House Chief of Staff, President George W. Bush
 Jens Spahn, Former German Federal Minister Of Health
Tobias Lindner, State Secretary in the German Ministry of Foreign Affairs 
Geoffrey Okamoto, Former First Deputy Managing Director, International Monetary Fund
Danyal Bayaz, Finance Minister, Baden-Württemberg

Extract of member list 
Below you can find an extract of the member list of the Atlantik Brücke e.V.

 Philip D. Murphy, former United States Ambassador to Germany
 Henry Kissinger, former Secretary of State of the United States of America
 Josef Ackermann, former CEO of Deutsche Bank, Germany
 Karl-Theodor zu Guttenberg, former Secretary of Defense of Germany
 Helmut Kohl, former Chancellor of Germany
 Helmut Schmidt, former Chancellor of Germany
 Rupert Stadler, former chairman of Audi AG
 Torsten Oltmanns, Global Marketing Director at Roland Berger Strategy Consultants
 Joachim Gauck, former President of Germany
 Angela Merkel, former Chancellor of Germany

References

Further reading

External links 
 

Lobbying in Germany
Germany–United States relations
Non-profit organisations based in Berlin
Political and economic think tanks based in Germany